Boktipset was a children's literature program running on Swedish public television company Sveriges Television 1976–1989. The program was usually about three to five minutes long, but occasionally the author of the featured book would be interviewed in a fifteen-minute segment. About two hundred episodes were produced. The show was frequently aired without advance knowledge.

Host Stefan Mählqvist sat on a rainbow colored couch and read an excerpt from the book. The theme song, "The Swimming Song" featured on the album Attempted Mustache (1973) by Loudon Wainwright III, was hummed at the beginning of each episode.

See also

Björnes magasin

References

Sveriges Television original programming